MS GNV Antares, formerly MS Pride of Bruges, is a ship operated by Grandi Navi Veloci.

History
The ship was built by Nippon Kokan K.K. Tsurumi Yard in Yokohama, Japan. The keel was laid in 1985 and was launched in 1986. Upon completion, the ship entered service in 1987 for North Sea Ferries, then a joint-venture between Dutch Nedlloyd and British P&O. The first years it sailed on the Rotterdam-Hull route with sister ship Norsea, replacing Norstar and Norland. The Norsun sailed under the Dutch flag and was owned by the Dutch half of the joint-venture, while the Norsea was British.

In 2002 the ships were transferred to the Zeebrugge-Hull route, again replacing Norstar and Norland. Both ships were internally modernised before entering service on this new route.

In October 2016 it was announced that Pride of Bruges and Pride of York would be refitted.

In October 2020, P&O announced that Pride of Bruges and Pride of York are to be taken out of service due to the decline in traffic caused by the COVID-19 pandemic. On 15 December 2020, P&O announced on Twitter that the service would be stopped from 1 January 2021. Both Pride of Bruges and sister ship Pride of York were sold to Grandi Navi Veloci.

Docking

Hull 
Pride of Bruges docked at terminal 2, King George Dock, Hull. Just a few hundred yards away is the terminal for the Hull-Rotterdam ferries. To leave Hull the ship had to squeeze through the lock bow first which only has a few centimetres of clearance on each side. To come back to dock in Hull, she passed through the lock bow first before she had to turn clockwise and reverse into the dock.

Zeebrugge    
Zeebrugge was much easier to dock at compared to Hull. The ship simply sailed into Zeebrugge harbour, turned to starboard into a docking area just south of Albert-II Dok and backed into the berth, opening her stern door on the linkspan.

In the media
The Pride of Bruges featured in Episode Three of the BBC Documentary Engineering Giants: Ferry Strip-Down, first broadcast on BBC Two on Sunday 29 July 2012. her sister ship, MS Pride of York, was also shown.

Ferry Strip Down | Engineering Giants | Spark - title of YouTube video
https://www.youtube.com/watch?v=4jNz5hs3m7A

References

External links

Norsun record on The Ferry Site
Norsun details on Belgium ferry site

Ferries of Belgium
Ferries of the United Kingdom
1986 ships
Ships of P&O Ferries
Ships built in Japan